Christian Henry Kahl (July 2, 1905 – August 22, 1985) was an American politician from Maryland and a member of the Democratic Party. He served as the Second Baltimore County Executive from 1958 to 1962. Kahl defeated Gordon G. Power, who was chairman of the Republican Party controlled Baltimore County Council in 1958.

References

1905 births
1985 deaths
Maryland Democrats
Politicians from Baltimore
Baltimore County Executives